Herlofson is a surname. Notable people with the surname include:

Axel Nicolai Herlofson (1845–1910), Norwegian fraudster 
Charles Herlofson (1891–1968), Norwegian footballer
Charles Oluf Herlofson (1916–1984), Norwegian naval officer
Harald Herlofson (1887–1957), Norwegian admiral